Break It Up was the fourth and final release from Boston crossover thrash band SSD.   It saw the band delve further into the metal genre, leaving behind their punk and hardcore roots.

Track listing

Side A
"Break It Up" (3:19)
"Children Will Rock" (3:46)
"Heart Failure" (4:35)
"Hit the Bottom" (4:28)
"Blood Flood" (5:07)

Side B
"No Solution" (4:17)
"Baby Black" (3:49)
"Calendar" (5:27)
"Screams of the Night" (4:58)
"Feel the Flame" (4:11)

Personnel
Springa - vocals
Al Barile - guitar
Francois Levesque - guitar
Jaime Sciarappa - bass
Chris Foley - drums

References

1985 albums
SSD (band) albums